Physique may refer to:

 The natural constitution, or physical structure, of a person (see Somatotype, Anthropometry, Body shape)
 In bodybuilding, the trained muscular structure of a person's body
 Physical fitness, a general state of health and well-being and, the ability to perform aspects of a sport or occupation
 Physical strength, the ability of an animal or human to exert force on physical objects using muscles
 Physical attractiveness, the degree to which a person's physical traits are considered aesthetically pleasing or beautiful
 Physique 57, New York City based fitness company
 Physique TV, Dubai based television channel dedicated to physical fitness

See also
 Physical (disambiguation)